Mette Iversen Sahlholdt (born 22 July 1977) is a Retired Danish handball player, who last played for Nykøbing Falster and the Danish national team. She is a goalkeeping coach for Nykøbing Falster Håndboldklub.

She participated at the 2015 World Women's Handball Championship.

References

1982 births
Living people
Danish female handball players
People from Svendborg
Sportspeople from the Region of Southern Denmark